The 2020–21 Melbourne Renegades Women's season was the sixth in the team's history. Coached by Lachlan Stevens and captained by Amy Satterthwaite, the Renegades played the entirety of WBBL06 in a bio-secure Sydney hub due to the COVID-19 pandemic. Suffering from a slew of fitness concerns throughout the tournament, it was the team's first campaign in which their performance on the points table did not improve from the previous year. The Renegades consequently finished the regular season in seventh place and failed to qualify for the finals.

Squad 
Each 2020–21 squad was made up of 15 active players. Teams could sign up to five 'marquee players', with a maximum of three of those from overseas. Marquees are classed as any overseas player, or a local player who holds a Cricket Australia national contract at the start of the WBBL|06 signing period.

Personnel changes made ahead of the season included:

 Erin Fazackerley signed with the Renegades, departing the Hobart Hurricanes.
 South African marquee player Lizelle Lee signed with the Renegades, departing the Melbourne Stars.
 New Zealand marquee player Amy Satterthwaite returned to the Renegades after a season's absence, having missed WBBL|05 while pregnant with her first child. Satterthwaite also resumed her role as captain, after Jess Duffin stepped into the position for a season.
 As part of Cricket Victoria's cost-cutting organisational restructure, the Renegades did not renew the contract of head coach Tim Coyle despite achieving two consecutive finals appearances. Lachlan Stevens, who coached the Renegades in their first two seasons, was announced as Coyle's replacement.
 On 25 September, the Renegades confirmed Jess Duffin would miss the WBBL|06 season following the birth of her first child in June. Explaining the decision, Duffin said: "The WBBL is such a high-quality competition with a lot of games in quick succession and unfortunately my body is just not ready for that at this point."

Changes made during the season included:
 New Zealand marquee Rosemary Mair was signed from the reserve player pool. She played five games for the Renegades from 3–14 November, replacing Lea Tahuhu (side strain).
 On 6 November, the Renegades announced Maitlan Brown would miss the remaining nine games of the season due to a hamstring injury.
 On 10 November, the Renegades announced Georgia Wareham would miss the remaining seven games of the season due to a "bone stress reaction" in her shin.
 Amy Yates was signed from the reserve player pool, replacing Georgia Wareham for six matches from 14 to 22 November.
Rebecca Carter was signed from the reserve player pool, replacing Maitlan Brown for one game on 22 November.

The table below lists the Renegades players and their key stats (including runs scored, batting strike rate, wickets taken, economy rate, catches and stumpings) for the season.

Ladder

Fixtures 

All times are local time

In front of a sold out reduced-capacity home crowd, the Sydney Sixers put on a 104-run opening partnership which came to an end during the 13th over when Alyssa Healy was stumped by Josie Dooley off the bowling of Molly Strano for 63. Two balls later, Ellyse Perry was dismissed for 37 by a spectacular diving catch from Courtney Webb, lauded as a contender for the best of the season. Marizanne Kapp (22 not out from 17 balls) and Erin Burns (19 off 11) helped the Sixers finish their innings with a total of 4/166.

On the first ball of the run chase, Lizelle Lee was dropped at backward point off the bowling of Perry. At just 3/70 in the 11th over, Webb joined Lee in the middle for the Melbourne Renegades to form a rapid 73-run stand from 33 deliveries. Sixers veteran Sarah Aley eventually broke through in the 16th over, removing Lee for 79 via a Burns catch in the outfield. Requiring 24 runs from the remaining 26 balls, Webb (46 not out off 28) saw the Renegades across the line with six wickets in hand inside the last over, mirroring her finishing heroics of a similarly tight encounter between the two teams in WBBL05. The loss dramatically decreased the Sixers' chances of qualifying for finals heading into the final day of the regular season.

The match was also shrouded in controversy, and the outcome potentially affected, due to an "administration error" self-reported by the Sixers before the commencement of the second innings. Hayley Silver-Holmes, who had missed several previous games due to injury, was named in the team line-up despite not having yet been granted approval by the W/BBL Technical Committee to be added back into the official squad. Upon discovering the mistake, the Sixers ensured Silver-Holmes took no active part in the game and Maddy Darke replaced her as a substitute fielder, leaving them a bowler short in what was essentially a must-win game. Cricket Australia (CA) fined the Sixers $25,000 ($15,000 suspended for twelve months) with CA's Head of Integrity and Security stating that the breach, "while serious in nature," had a "reduced impact due to the Club's actions" during the game.

Statistics and awards 
 Most runs: Lizelle Lee – 261 (13th in the league)
Highest score in an innings: Lizelle Lee – 79 (45) vs Sydney Sixers, 21 November
Most wickets: Carly Leeson, Sophie Molineux – 11 each (equal 17th in the league)
Best bowling figures in an innings: Ella Hayward – 4/16 (4 overs) vs Melbourne Stars, 15 November
Most catches: Molly Strano – 6 (equal 11th in the league)
Player of the Match awards:
Lizelle Lee, Carly Leeson, Courtney Webb – 1 each
WBBL06 Young Gun: Courtney Webb (week 4 nominee)
Renegades Most Valuable Player: Courtney Webb

References 

2020–21 Women's Big Bash League season by team
Melbourne Renegades (WBBL)